Hunter Yeany (born 11 May 2005) is an American racing driver who is currently competing in the 2023 FIA Formula 3 Championship for Rodin Carlin. He previously raced in the Indy Pro 2000 and Formula Regional Americas championships, both with Velocity Racing Development. He was the 2020 Formula 4 United States champion.

Career

Karting 
Yeany's karting career was predominantly in the US: finishing 13th in the 2019 SKUSA SuperNationals XX11 - KA100 Junior Class by RLV. Aside from that, not much is known about his karting career.

Lower formulae 
In 2020 Yeany made his single seater debut in the Formula 4 US Championship with Velocity Racing Development, alongside Kyffin Simpson and Erik Evans. He dominated the championship, taking 7 wins and 14 podiums from 15 races on his way to becoming the youngest ever winner of a Formula 4 series. His early clinching of the title led to him skipping the final round at COTA. Overall he finished 58 points ahead of second in the standings.

Formula Regional Americas Championship 
Hunter made his debut in the Formula Regional Americas Championship in the final round of the 2020 season, continuing with Velocity Racing Development. The American finished all three races in the top ten, but was unable to score points due to his status as a guest driver. For 2021 raced in the series full time with the same team.

Road to Indy Career 
Also in 2021 Yeany competed in the Indy Pro 2000 Championship with Velocity Racing Development.

GB3 Championship 
For the fourth round of the 2021 GB3 Championship Yeany joined Fortec Motorsports, partnering Roberto Faria and Mikkel Grundtvig. The American scored eighth and 15th placed finishes in the first two races respectively, and achieved his first podium on a European racetrack with third place in the reversed grid race on Sunday.

FIA Formula 3 Championship

2021 
In August 2021 Yeany was announced to join the FIA Formula 3 Championship at the Spa-Francorchamps round, replacing Formula 2-bound Enzo Fittipaldi at Charouz Racing System. He achieved a best race result of eighteenth place over two rounds. He missed the final round due to clashing commitments with the Formula Regional Americas Championship and was replaced by Ayrton Simmons.

2022 

Yeany took part in the 2021 post-season test at Circuit Ricardo Tormo with Campos Racing. In January 2022, the team announced that Yeany would drive for them in the 2022 season.

In the Spielberg round, during the sprint race, Yeany injured his wrist while making contact with a rival. He managed to continue and finish 21st. However, due to his injury, he was forced to withdraw from the feature race. Ultimately, he had to miss the Budapest round as well and was replaced by Oliver Goethe. He also missed the Zandvoort round and was replaced by Sebastian Montoya. Yeany made his return at the final round in Monza, and finished the races 24th and 17th. Yeany failed to score points and finished 33rd in the championship, with a best finish of 16th.

At the end of September, Yeany partook in the post-season test with Carlin, on Day 1 and Day 3 at Jerez.

2023
On 19 December 2022, it was announced that Yeany would drive for Carlin in the 2023 season.

Karting record

Karting career summary

Racing record

Racing career summary 

* Season still in progress.
† As Yeany was a guest driver, he was ineligible to score points.

Complete Formula 4 United States Championship results
(key) (Races in bold indicate pole position) (Races in italics indicate fastest lap)

Complete Indy Pro 2000 Championship results 
(key) (Races in bold indicate pole position) (Races in italics indicate fastest lap)

Complete FIA Formula 3 Championship results 
(key) (Races in bold indicate pole position; races in italics indicate points for the fastest lap of top ten finishers)

References

External links 
 
  (Second website)
 
 FormulaScout

2005 births
Living people
Racing drivers from Virginia
Indy Pro 2000 Championship drivers
FIA Formula 3 Championship drivers
Charouz Racing System drivers
Fortec Motorsport drivers
Sportspeople from Virginia Beach, Virginia
BRDC British Formula 3 Championship drivers
Formula Regional Americas Championship drivers
Campos Racing drivers
Carlin racing drivers
United States F4 Championship drivers